The Japan Federation of Press Workers' Unions (Shinbunroren) is a trade union representing journalists in Japan.

The union was founded on 30 June 1950.  It affiliated to the General Council of Trade Unions of Japan (Sohyo), and by 1958 it had 27,056 members, its membership growing to 38,057 in 1970, and 41,961 by 1985.

In 1989, Sohyo merged into the Japanese Trade Union Confederation, but Shinbunroren decided instead to become independent.  As of 2019, it had 21,876 members.

References

External links

Journalists' trade unions
Trade unions established in 1950
Trade unions in Japan